Memphrémagog is a regional county municipality in the Estrie region of Quebec, Canada.

History
After the signing of the Treaty of Paris on September 3, 1783, the American Revolutionary War ended. the state of Vermont was established in 1791. The border of Lower Canada was then defined at approximately 45 degrees north latitude. The territory immediately adjacent to it became part of Quebec in 1848.

Subdivisions
There are 17 subdivisions within the RCM:

Cities & Towns (2)
 Magog
 Stanstead

Municipalities (8)
 Austin
 Bolton-Est
 Eastman
 Hatley
 Ogden
 Saint-Benoît-du-Lac
 Saint-Étienne-de-Bolton
 Sainte-Catherine-de-Hatley

Townships (4)
 Hatley
 Orford
 Potton
 Stanstead

Villages (3)
 Ayer's Cliff
 North Hatley
 Stukely-Sud

Demographics

Population

Language

Transportation

Access Routes
Highways and numbered routes that run through the municipality, including external routes that start or finish at the county border:

 Autoroutes
 
 

 Principal Highways
 
 
 
 

 Secondary Highways
 
 
 
 
 
 

 External Routes

See also
 List of regional county municipalities and equivalent territories in Quebec
 Lake Memphremagog

References

External links
 Official tourist site for Memphrémagog

 
Magog, Quebec